Diplomats and Military Commanders for Change (DMCC) was an ad hoc organization of 27 retired and United States military officers and Foreign Service Officers who supported Democratic U.S. Senator John Kerry of Massachusetts against incumbent Republican George W. Bush in the 2004 presidential election.

The group was formed in Washington, D.C. on June 16, 2004, at the National Press Club. The group published an open letter that stated that President George W. Bush had "failed in the primary responsibilities of preserving national security and providing world leadership" and had harmed foreign relations so badly that only a new leader can repair them.

This statement is especially noteworthy because several of the signatories had supported George W. Bush when he ran for president in 2000, and a large number were appointed to positions by Republican presidents, including Bush's father, President George H. W. Bush.

Members
Avis T. Bohlen, former Assistant Secretary of State for Arms Control and Ambassador to Bulgaria
William J. Crowe, Ambassador to the United Kingdom under President Bill Clinton and Chairman of the Joint Chiefs of Staff under President Ronald Reagan
Jeffrey Davidow, former Ambassador to Zambia, Venezuela, and Mexico.
William DePree, former Ambassador to Bangladesh and Mozambique
Donald B. Easum, former Ambassador to Nigeria and Upper Volta
Charles W. Freeman, former Ambassador to Saudi Arabia
William Harrop, former Ambassador to Israel
Arthur A. Hartman, Ambassador to France and to the Soviet Union 
Joseph Hoar, former commander of United States Central Command
H. Allen Holmes, former Assistant Secretary of Defense for Special Operations and former Ambassador to Portugal
Robert V. Keeley, former Ambassador to Greece, Zimbabwe, and Mauritius
Samuel Lewis, former Ambassador to Israel
Princeton N. Lyman, former Assistant Secretary of State for International Organization Affairs, and Ambassador to South Africa and Nigeria
Donald McHenry, former Ambassador to the United Nations
Merrill McPeak, former Chief of Staff of the United States Air Force
Jack F. Matlock, Jr., a member of the National Security Council staff under Reagan and Ambassador to the Soviet Union from 1987 to 1991
George Moose, former Ambassador to Senegal and Benin
David D. Newsom, former Ambassador to the Philippines and Indonesia
Phyllis Oakley, former Assistant Secretary of State for Intelligence and Research
Robert B. Oakley, former Ambassador to Pakistan, Somalia and Zaire
James D. Phillips, former Ambassador to the Republic of the Congo and Burundi
John Reinhardt, former Director of the United States Information Agency and Ambassador to Nigeria
William Y. Smith, former Chief of Staff for Supreme Headquarters Allied Powers Europe
Ronald I. Spiers, Under-Secretary-General of the United Nations for Political Affairs and former Ambassador to the Bahamas, Turkey, and Pakistan
Michael Sterner, former Ambassador to the United Arab Emirates
Stansfield Turner, former Director of the Central Intelligence Agency
Alexander Watson, former Ambassador to Brazil and Peru

A 27th member, Robert B. Oakley, was announced June 15, 2004.

External links
Diplomats and Military Commanders for Change Official Statement - June 16, 2004
Webcast of the press conference - June 16, 2004 at the National Press Club.

Foreign policy political advocacy groups in the United States